Sarah Siddons (1755–1831) was a Welsh-born stage actress, the best-known tragedienne of the 18th century.

Sarah Siddons may also refer to:

 Sarah Siddons (horse), a racehorse
 Sarah Siddons (locomotive), an electric locomotive on the London Underground from 1923 to 1962
 Sarah Siddons as the Tragic Muse, a 1784 painting by Joshua Reynolds

See also 
 Sarah Siddons Award
 Sarah Siddons Society